The De Gasperi VIII Cabinet held office in the Italian Republic from 16 July to 17 August 1953, a total of just 32 days. It was the first government of the Republic to fall at its inaugural Parliamentary vote of confidence, having been submitted to Parliament by President Luigi Einaudi.

It is one of the shortest cabinets in Italian history.

Composition

References

Italian governments
1953 establishments in Italy
1953 disestablishments in Italy
Cabinets established in 1953
Cabinets disestablished in 1953
De Gasperi 8 Cabinet